aka Flower of the Night is a 1976 Japanese film in Nikkatsu's Roman porno series, directed by Katsuhiko Fujii and starring Naomi Tani.

Synopsis
Kizaki kidnaps Yuriko and engages in a rape and torture session with her, which he photographs. With the photos, he blackmails aristocratic flower arrangement teacher Yumeji, Yuriko's older sister. Rather than allow him to shame her clan by sending the photos to the media, Yumeji goes to Kizaki. Kizaki then proceeds to rape and torture Yumeji, who was his true desire all along. Yumeji escapes from Kizaki at the end of the film.

Cast
 Naomi Tani
 Erina Miyai
 Osamu Tsuruoka
 Tokuko Watanabe
 Shinsho Nakamaru
 Tamaki Katsura

Background 
Director Katsuhiko Fujii had been a competent director at Nikkatsu, making lower-profile sequels in the Apartment Wife and Eros Schedule Book series until his talent for SM showed through in the Naomi Tani project, Cruelty: Black Rose Torture (1975). In Lady Moonflower he teamed up with Tani again, with a script by her long-time collaborator, SM-author Oniroku Dan. Kōyū Ohara would direct a more successful variation on the story of Lady Moonflower, also scripted by Dan and starring Tani, in Fairy in a Cage (1977), which is regarded as one of the best of Nikkatsu's forays into the SM-themed pink film.

Bibliography

English

Japanese

Notes

1976 films
1970s Japanese-language films
Nikkatsu films
Nikkatsu Roman Porno
1970s Japanese films